Purnal William Goldy (November 28, 1937 – September 21, 2009) was an American professional baseball outfielder. The native of Camden, New Jersey, was signed by Detroit out of Temple University.

During his two MLB trials, Goldy was a .231 hitter (18 hits in 78 at bats) with three home runs and 12 RBI in 29 games, including nine runs, one double and one triple.

A veteran of seven Minor league seasons, Goldy hit a combined .299 batting average with 70 home runs and 409 RBI in 790 games for six different teams between 1959 and 1965. In 1960, he led the Class A Sally League in batting (.342) and hits, and was named to the league's all-star team.

Goldy died in Denver, Colorado, at the age of 71.

External links
BR major league statistics
BR minor league statistics
Retrosheet

1937 births
2009 deaths
Baseball players from Camden, New Jersey
Birmingham Barons players
Columbus Jets players
Detroit Tigers players
Denver Bears players
Durham Bulls players
Erie Sailors players
Knoxville Smokies players
Major League Baseball right fielders
Syracuse Chiefs players
Temple Owls baseball players